Jonas Ödman is the Managing Member of Brown Marlin Gaming Technologies, Ltd Liability Co., a business-to-business software provider for the regulated US gambling market.

Career
Following a few years as usability consultant in the late 1990s and a few years at the Swedish National Police Board as Product Manager, Ödman joined Ongame in 2004 as Product Manager for Ongame Network, Ongame’s B2B arm. Ödman worked during the sales process of Ongame to Austrian publicly traded company Bwin (then Betandwin).

Following the sale of Ongame in 2006, Ödman was one of the founders of Gnuf.com, a Malta-based poker and casino website.

In September 2009 Ödman joined Bodog Network as Vice President and made a presentation at the EiG conference in Copenhagen titled “The Ultimate Solution to Rakeback Problems”, the first step of what would later be known as the Bodog Recreational Poker Model. Two years later, in November 2011, Bodog Network launched a new software with a new feature: Anonymous Tables for all tables, including tournaments. This was another controversial step initiated by Ödman and created a storm of angry reactions in the poker forums but has with time proven to be very successful. In June 2012 Ödman took over as President of Bodog Network.

In June 2013 Ödman left Bodog Network and started to work on a new venture in California. He founded Brown Marlin Gaming Technologies, Ltd Liability Co., in August 2013 and with this company Ödman’s hopes to bring his recreational poker model to the regulated US market.

Personal life
Ödman started playing cards at a very young age and played junior elite bridge in Sweden in the late 1980s. Ödman won his first poker tournament in Las Vegas in July 2006, a $7,200 first prize at the Mirage Casino. He also played in WSOP Main Event that year but did not cash. His biggest poker success came in the Nordic Masters in Stockholm in March 2007 where he finished 2nd and won $130,000.

Ödman is married and has two children.

References

Swedish businesspeople
Year of birth missing (living people)
Living people